Mario Party: The Top 100 is a party video game developed by NDcube and published by Nintendo for the Nintendo 3DS. It is the fifth installment in the handheld series of Mario Party games and is primarily a compilation of 100 minigames from across the series. It was released first in North America in November 2017, and was released in PAL regions and in Japan in December 2017. It is the third and final Mario Party game for the Nintendo 3DS family of systems. A similar entry on the Nintendo Switch, Mario Party Superstars, was announced and released in 2021.

Gameplay

Mario Party: The Top 100 features 100 minigames that were previously featured in earlier games in the Mario Party series, all of which are taken from the home console entries. Most of the minigames were visually updated from the originals. Several minigames that appeared in Mario Party games for the Wii were reworked to properly function on the Nintendo 3DS, which lacks the Wii's motion controls. The game features several game modes; in Minigame Match, which is hosted by Toad, players move around a single game board at the same time, with the goal being to collect the most coins and stars as in previous Mario Party titles. Minigame Island is also hosted by Toad, and it consists of playing through pre-selected minigames to advance along a linear path in 4 worlds. Championship Battles is hosted by Toadette, and it consists of playing 3 or 5 minigames from a selected pack with the player(s) winning the most minigames being declared the winner. Decathlon is also hosted by Toadette, and it consists of playing 5 or 10 minigames to see who gets the most points. The game also includes a freeplay mode in which the player can choose which minigames to play. 41 of the game's 100 minigames must be unlocked by first playing through Minigame Island. The game supports multiplayer for up to four players, either through the use of individual copies of the game or through 3DS download play with only player required to have a copy of the game.

The game has eight playable characters: Mario, Luigi, Princess Peach, Princess Daisy, Wario, Waluigi, Yoshi, and Rosalina.

Reception

According to Metacritic, the game received "mixed or average reviews". Kirstin Swalley of Hardcore Gamer criticized the game for featuring only one board map, and stated that the game lacked the "complex and competitive nature" of earlier games.

Matt West of Nintendo World Report considered the single board map to be the game's "biggest disappointment", and stated that the original control setup for some minigames did not feel right on the 3DS. Allegra Frank of Polygon felt that the Minigame Match mode was superior to Minigame Island, which she considered to be repetitive and lacking in fun because of the absence of a board map.

Mario Party: The Top 100 sold 52,181 copies within its first week on sale in Japan, which placed it at #5 on the all-format video game sales chart.

Notes

References

External links

2017 video games
Multiplayer and single-player video games
Mario Party
Nintendo 3DS eShop games
Nintendo 3DS games
Nintendo 3DS-only games
Party video games
Video games developed in Japan
Video games that use Amiibo figurines
Minigame compilations
NDcube games